Shumilov is a Russian masculine surname, its feminine counterpart is Shumilova. It may refer to
Anna Shumilova (born 1980), Russian rhythmic gymnastics coach
Ekaterina Shumilova (born 1986), Russian biathlete
Igor Shumilov (born 1993), Belarusian football player
Mikhail Shumilov (1895-1975), Soviet Army General in World War II

Russian-language surnames